Robert Mervyn Storey (born 4 September 1964), usually known as Mervyn Storey, is a Unionist politician from Northern Ireland. He formerly represented the Democratic Unionist Party (DUP) in the Northern Ireland Assembly, where he was a Member of the Legislative Assembly (MLA) for North Antrim from 2003 until he lost his seat in May 2022. Storey was Minister for Social Development in the Northern Ireland Executive (2014–16), and in 2016 was appointed Minister for Finance and Personnel.

Biography
Robert Mervyn Storey was born in Armoy, County Antrim on 4 September 1964. His father Nat was a founder member of the Protestant Unionist Party and an election worker for Ian Paisley. Storey was educated at Armoy Primary School and at Ballymoney High School. On leaving school in 1980 he worked in a bacon factory, rising to production manager. In 2000 he left the company and joined Ian Paisley's constituency office in Ballymena.

Family
Storey is married to Christine and has three children.

Political activity
Storey is a former member of the Fire Authority for Northern Ireland. Storey was elected to Ballymoney council in 2001 and again in 2005. He is a member of the Ballymoney Local Strategy Partnership and Regional Partnership for Northern Ireland. In 2000 he served as campaign manager for William McCrea's by-election for South Antrim and also in 2001 for Gregory Campbell and Ian Paisley's elections in East Londonderry and North Antrim respectively. All three campaigns were successful.

Storey was elected to the Northern Ireland Assembly in the 2003 elections. From 2008 to 2014 he was chairman of the Northern Ireland Assembly Committee for Education. He lost his Assembly seat in the election held on 5 May 2022, thus ceasing to be an MLA.

From September 2014 to January 2016 Storey was Minister for Social Development. He resigned from this post several times during September and October 2015 in the context of a political crisis.

In January 2016 Storey was appointed Minister for Finance & Personnel.
 
As a young earth creationist, and a member of the "Council of Reference" of the creationist Caleb Foundation, he petitioned the then Northern Irish education minister, Caitríona Ruane, to have intelligent design taught in schools in Northern Ireland, as well as objecting to an exhibition on evolution in the Ulster Museum and signs at the Giants Causeway in his North Antrim constituency.

References

1964 births
Living people
Ministers of the Northern Ireland Executive (since 1999)
Democratic Unionist Party MLAs
Northern Ireland MLAs 2003–2007
Northern Ireland MLAs 2007–2011
Northern Ireland MLAs 2011–2016
Northern Ireland MLAs 2016–2017
Northern Ireland MLAs 2017–2022
People from County Antrim
Presbyterians from Northern Ireland
Christian Young Earth creationists
Ministers of Finance and Personnel of Northern Ireland